Elections to Moyle District Council were held on 19 May 1993 on the same day as the other Northern Irish local government elections. The election used three district electoral areas to elect a total of 15 councillors.

Election results

Note: "Votes" are the first preference votes.

Districts summary

|- class="unsortable" align="centre"
!rowspan=2 align="left"|Ward
! % 
!Cllrs
! % 
!Cllrs
! %
!Cllrs
! %
!Cllrs
! % 
!Cllrs
!rowspan=2|TotalCllrs
|- class="unsortable" align="center"
!colspan=2 bgcolor="" | SDLP
!colspan=2 bgcolor="" | DUP
!colspan=2 bgcolor="" | UUP
!colspan=2 bgcolor="" | Sinn Féin
!colspan=2 bgcolor="white"| Others
|-
|align="left"|Ballycastle
|26.2
|1
|22.6
|1
|8.9
|1
|6.8
|0
|bgcolor="#DDDDDD"|35.5
|bgcolor="#DDDDDD"|2
|5
|-
|align="left"|Giant's Causeway
|0.0
|0
|28.0
|2
|19.8
|1
|0.0
|0
|bgcolor="#0077FF"|52.2
|bgcolor="#0077FF"|2
|5
|-
|align="left"|The Glens
|bgcolor="#99FF66"|42.7
|bgcolor="#99FF66"|2
|8.4
|0
|0.0
|0
|15.2
|1
|33.7
|2
|5
|-'
|-
|- class="unsortable" class="sortbottom" style="background:#C9C9C9"
|align="left"| Total
|25.8
|3
|18.4
|3
|7.5
|2
|8.3
|1
|40.0
|6
|15
|-
|}

Districts results

Ballycastle

1989: 2 x Independent, 1 x SDLP, 1 x DUP, 1 x UUP
1993: 2 x Independent, 1 x SDLP, 1 x DUP, 1 x UUP
1989-1993 Change: No change

Giant's Causeway

1989: 2 x Independent Unionist, 2 x DUP, 1 x UUP
1993: 2 x Independent Unionist, 2 x DUP, 1 x UUP
1989-1993 Change: No change

The Glens

1989: 3 x SDLP, 1 x Sinn Féin, 1 x Independent Nationalist
1993: 2 x SDLP, 1 x Sinn Féin, 1 x Independent Nationalist, 1 x Independent Republican
1989-1993 Change: Independent Republican gain from SDLP

References

Moyle District Council elections
Moyle